The Jammu and Kashmir Apni Youth Federation (JKAYF) also known as Youth Apni Party is youth wing of Jammu and Kashmir Apni Party in Jammu and Kashmir, India. It is founded in March 2020.

References 

Political parties in Jammu and Kashmir
Youth politics
2020 establishments in Jammu and Kashmir